The Smalcald Articles or Schmalkald Articles are a summary of Lutheran doctrine, written by Martin Luther in 1537 for a meeting of the Schmalkaldic League in preparation for an intended ecumenical Council of the Church.

History
Luther's patron, Elector John Frederick of Saxony, asked him to prepare these articles for the Schmalkaldic League's meeting in 1537, held again in Schmalkalden.  The League had been organized in 1531 as a union of various Lutheran territories and cities, to provide a united military and political front against Roman Catholic politicians and armies, led by Emperor Charles V.

When the Schmalkaldic League met, Luther was taken very ill with a severe case of kidney stones and so was unable to attend the meeting. The league ultimately determined not to adopt the articles Luther had written. They were influenced not to adopt the Smalcald Articles by Philipp Melanchthon, who was concerned that Luther's writing would be regarded as divisive by some.  Melanchthon was asked to write a clear statement on the papacy and this he did, a document that was adopted at the meeting as the Treatise on the Power and Primacy of the Pope.

In the Smalcald Articles, Luther summarized what he regarded to be the most important teaching in Christianity. The Articles were highly prized by John Frederick who ordered that they be made a part of his last will and testament.  And though they were not adopted at the meeting of the Schmalkaldic League in 1537, most of the theologians present at that meeting subscribed to it. Parts of Hesse accepted them as confessional writing in 1544 and in the 1550s, the Smalcald Articles were used authoritatively by many Gnesio-Lutherans as well as being incorporated into “corpora doctrinae” during the following 20 years. In 1580, it was accepted as a confessional document in the Book of Concord.

First article
The first and chief article is this: Jesus Christ, our God and Lord, died for our sins and was raised again for our justification (Romans 3:24–25). He alone is the Lamb of God who takes away the sins of the world (John 1:29), and God has laid on Him the iniquity of us all (Isaiah 53:6). All have sinned and are justified freely, without their own works and merits, by His grace (Eph 2:8-9), through the redemption that is in Christ Jesus, in His blood (Romans 3:23–28). This is necessary to believe. This cannot be otherwise acquired or grasped by any work, law, or merit.  Therefore, it is clear and certain that this faith alone justifies us… Nothing of this article can be yielded or surrendered, even though heaven and earth and everything else falls (Mark 13:31)

Translations
The Smalcald Articles are available in the following translations:
Bente, F., translator and editor. Concordia Triglotta. St. Louis: Concordia Publishing House, 1921.
Kolb, Robert and Timothy J. Wengert, eds.  The Book of Concord: The Confessions of the Evangelical Lutheran Church.  Minneapolis: Fortress Press, 2000.  
McCain, Paul T., Robert C. Baker, Gene Edward Veith, and Edward A. Engelbrecht, eds. Concordia: The Lutheran Confessions — A Reader's Edition of the Book of Concord. St. Louis: Concordia Publishing House, 2005. 
Tappert, Theodore G., ed.  The Book of Concord: The Confessions of the Evangelical Lutheran Church. Philadelphia: Fortress Press, 1959.

Bibliography
Bente, Friedrich. Historical Introductions to the Book of Concord. (1921) Reprint. St. Louis: Concordia Publishing House, 1965.

References

External links
Smalcald Articles

 

1537 works
Book of Concord
Martin Luther
16th-century Christian texts